Susan Stamberg (born September 7, 1938) is an American radio journalist. Stamberg was co-host of NPR's flagship program All Things Considered from 1972. In that role Stamberg was the first female host of a national news broadcast.  She's considered one of NPR's "Founding Mothers" along with Nina Totenberg, Linda Wertheimer and the late Cokie Roberts. After nearly 50 years at the network, Stamberg is a Special Correspondent and her reports appear weekly on NPR's Morning Edition.

Early life
Susan Stamberg was born Susan Levitt in Newark, New Jersey. She graduated Barnard College in 1959.

Career
For 14 years, beginning in 1972, Stamberg served as co-host of All Things Considered, the evening news magazine. She was the first woman to hold a full-time position as anchor of a national nightly news broadcast in the United States.  She was awarded the Edward R. Murrow Award (CPB). She was the host of Weekend Edition Sunday from 1987 to 1989. In 1994, Stamberg was inducted into the Broadcasting Hall of Fame. In 1996, she was inducted into the National Radio Hall of Fame. For her contributions to radio Stamberg was awarded a star on the Hollywood Walk of Fame, March 3, 2020.

Stamberg interviewed Fred Rogers several times as host of All Things Considered. In the 1980s Stamberg and Rogers recorded several television specials.

Each Thanksgiving since 1971, Stamberg provides NPR listeners with her mother-in-law's recipe for a cranberry relish sauce that is unusual in having horseradish as one of its principal ingredients. Each year Stamberg comes up with a new way to present the recipe in a new way, notably sharing the dish with rapper Coolio in 2010. The recipe is known as Mama Stamberg's Cranberry Relish Recipe, although it was originally published in 1959 by Craig Claiborne in his food column.

One of her most memorable interviews was with Nobel Prize–winning economist Milton Friedman. Stamberg argued with Friedman over the merits of the free market, claiming her conversations with "Russian cabbies" on the streets of New York had shown that the expatriates preferred life in the former Communist country to "how dreadfully tough their lives are here (the United States)."  Friedman dismissed Stamberg's observation, contending, "I'm saying if you really want to know what they really believe about the relative merits of the two systems, see what they do, not what they say. And what they do is to stay here. They don't go back."

Stamberg was also the first host of the long-running PBS arts series Alive from Off Center, hosting from 1985 to 1986.

Personal life
Stamberg was married to Louis C. Stamberg, who died on October 9, 2007. During a career with the Agency for International Development Louis Stamberg worked as a program officer and spent more than two years at the USAID mission in New Delhi. Stamberg is the mother of actor Josh Stamberg. She is Jewish. She is a cousin to All Things Considered host Ari Shapiro.

See also
List of NPR personnel

References

External links
NPR bio page

Susan Stamberg papers at University of Maryland libraries

1938 births
Living people
American broadcast news analysts
American radio journalists
American reporters and correspondents
Barnard College alumni
The High School of Music & Art alumni
NPR personalities
People from Newark, New Jersey
Edward R. Murrow Award (CPB) winners
American women radio journalists
Journalists from New York City
American women television journalists
20th-century American Jews
21st-century American Jews
20th-century American women
21st-century American women